The 2017 World Mountain Running Championships was the 33rd edition of the global Mountain running competition, World Mountain Running Championships, organised by the World Mountain Running Association and was held in  Premana, Italy on 30 June 2017.

Results senior

Men individual

Men team

Women individual

Women team

Results junior

Men individual

Men team

Women individual

Women team

References

External links
 World Mountain Running Association official web site

World Mountain Running Championships
World Long Distance Mountain Running